André Korff (born 16 June 1973) is a German professional road bicycle racer. Despite being a sprinter, he only managed to take two wins in his entire career.

He lives in Forchheim, Germany, with his wife and two children.

Palmares 

 Rheinland-Pfalz Rundfahrt - 1 stage (2004)
 GP Tell - 1 stage (1998)

External links

1973 births
Living people
German male cyclists
Sportspeople from Erfurt
People from Bezirk Erfurt
Cyclists from Thuringia
21st-century German people